Tiexi Stadium (Simplified Chinese: 铁西新区体育中心) is the multi-purpose stadium and multi-use gymnasium in Tiexi District, Shenyang, China. West Stadium, the nickname of the football and athletics stadium, has a capacity of 30,000 people. and the gymnasium has a capacity of 4,000 people.

References

Football venues in China
Sports venues in Liaoning